Fielding Graduate University (previously Fielding Graduate Institute and The Fielding Institute) is a private graduate-level university in Santa Barbara, California. It offers postgraduate and doctoral studies mainly in psychology, education, and organizational studies, primarily through distance education programs.

Fielding Graduate University was founded in 1974 by Frederic M. Hudson, Hallock Hoffman, and Renata Tesch. They designed Fielding as a graduate program for mid-career professionals who were not being served by traditional universities.

Academics
The university offers graduate programs for adult professionals seeking master's and doctoral degrees. It offers degree and certificate programs through the School of Psychology and School of Leadership Studies. The programs include online learning, individual faculty-student mentoring and assessment, and in-person events of various types in many locations throughout the year. The professions targeted include clinical psychology, media psychology, educational leadership, organizational leadership, and human development, within the corporate, nonprofit, and public sectors. Fielding was the first university to offer a Ph.D program in media psychology.

Fielding's learning model implements a student learning plan, contract-based learning, competency-based assessment, student-to-student peer feedback, project and portfolio reviews, and final thesis or dissertation. The school's website says that its "distributed learning model" combines "in-person" and "remote" participation.
, its School of Leadership offers "accelerated" Ph.D. degrees that can be earned in as little as three years, and its School of Psychology offers a Ph.D. in Clinical Psychology that can be earned in five or six years. The average (mean) time to complete a PhD program at Fielding is 7.5 years.

The university is accredited by the WASC Senior College and University Commission (WSCUC). Its APA accreditation was restored in 2019 after being listed on probation.

Partnerships
Fielding offers a doctorate in Creative Leadership through the University of the Virgin Islands (UVI), is developing a doctoral program in urban leadership and entrepreneurship with the University of District of Columbia and Tulane University’s Payson Center for Global Development, and established the Center for the Advancement of STEM Leadership with UVI, North Carolina A&T, and the Association of American Colleges & Universities. The latter earned a $9 million National Science Foundation grant in 2018.

In 2015 the university was granted special consultative status to the United Nations Economic and Social Council (ECOSOC).

Notable alumni 
 Evelyn Torton Beck - feminist theorist and professor at University of Maryland, College Park
 Tara Brach - psychologist and meditation expert
 Marshall Colt - television actor, psychologist
 K. Drorit "Dee" Gaines - neuropsychologist and radio host
 Devon Jersild - psychologist and author
 Salud Carbajal - United States Representative from California's 24th congressional district
 Janja Lalich - sociologist studying cults
 Gina Loudon - Republican activist
 Lyle Nelson - Four Time Olympian in the Biathlon, 13 time United States or North American Champion
 Marilyn Price-Mitchell - psychologist and columnist
 Judith Sewell Wright - American author, speaker, lifestyles expert and life coach
 Steven Hassan - Founder of the Freedom of Mind Resource Center, author, speaker, de-programming expert

Notable faculty 
 Tiffany Field - psychologist
 Ruthellen Josselson - clinical psychologist
 Malcolm Knowles - adult education scholar
 Jeremy J. Shapiro - psychologist and social theorist
Four Arrows - Education, Leadership, and Psychology scholar

References

External links
Official website

Fielding Graduate University
Universities and colleges in Santa Barbara County, California
Buildings and structures in Santa Barbara, California
Educational institutions established in 1974
1974 establishments in California
Schools accredited by the Western Association of Schools and Colleges